Sarah Margaret Qualley (born October 23, 1994) is an American actress. The daughter of actress Andie MacDowell and sister of actress and singer Rainey Qualley, she trained as a ballerina in her youth. She made her acting debut with a minor role in the 2013 drama film Palo Alto, and gained recognition for playing a troubled teenager in the HBO television series The Leftovers (2014–2017).

In 2019, she received critical acclaim for her portrayal of actress and dancer Ann Reinking in the FX biographical miniseries Fosse/Verdon, for which she was nominated for a Primetime Emmy Award. She appeared in the films The Nice Guys (2016), Death Note (2017), Once Upon a Time in Hollywood (2019), and had a voice role in the video game Death Stranding (2019). In 2021, she starred in the acclaimed Netflix drama miniseries Maid, which earned her nominations for another Primetime Emmy Award and a Golden Globe Award.

Early life and education
Sarah Margaret Qualley was born on October 23, 1994, in Kalispell, Montana. She is the daughter of actress and model Andie MacDowell, and former model Paul Qualley. She has an older brother, Justin, and an older sister, actress and singer Rainey Qualley.

The Qualley siblings spent their early years on a ranch in Missoula, Montana, moving to Asheville, North Carolina when Margaret was four. Qualley's parents separated when she was five years old, and she subsequently split her time equally between them. Her family home with MacDowell is in North Carolina, where they have extended family nearby.

As a teenager growing up in Asheville, North Carolina, she and her sister were both debutantes, and Qualley made her debut at the Bal des débutantes in Paris. She left home at 14 to board at the North Carolina School of the Arts, where she studied dance. She trained as a ballerina, earning an apprenticeship at the American Ballet Theatre and studying at New York's Professional Children's School. However, at the age of 16, following an offer to become an apprentice with the North Carolina Dance Theater company, Qualley decided to quit dance. In order to stay in New York, she began working as a model. Of this period, Qualley says: "I wrote to my mom saying: 'Look, I don't think I want to be a dancer any more so I'm going to quit ballet and stay here. I will have this and this income next week.' I laid it out in a way that she couldn't say no because I was so organized." Qualley later changed her focus to acting and attended London's Royal Academy of Dramatic Art summer program. Qualley attended New York University but left after a semester for acting roles.

Career

Modeling
In 2011, Qualley made her modeling debut at the age of 16 during New York Fashion Week, walking for Alberta Ferretti. She modeled during Paris Fashion Week Spring/Summer 2012 for Valentino and Chanel. She again walked for Chanel during their Fall/Winter 2012 show. Qualley has posed for publications such as Vogue, W, Teen Vogue, Interview, Vanity Fair, and Nylon. Qualley appeared in the Ralph Lauren Fall/Winter 2016 print campaign, shot by Steven Meisel. Qualley is a house ambassador for Chanel.

Acting
Qualley first appeared on screen in 2013 playing a small part in Gia Coppola's film Palo Alto. She received the part because she happened to be on set visiting her then-boyfriend, Nat Wolff.

In June 2013, Qualley was cast as a series regular in the HBO television series The Leftovers. Qualley reprised her role as Jill Garvey for the subsequent second and third seasons of The Leftovers in 2015 and 2017, respectively.

Qualley next appeared in Shane Black's 2016 comedy The Nice Guys. In April 2016, Qualley was announced to have joined the cast of Shawn Christensen's The Vanishing of Sidney Hall. The film premiered at the 2017 Sundance Film Festival, alongside another film of hers, Novitiate. In Novitiate, Qualley stars as Sister Cathleen, a young woman who begins to question her faith as she trains to be a nun. The film was released on October 27, 2017. That same year, Qualley starred in Death Note, directed by Adam Wingard.

In 2018, Qualley appeared in Donnybrook, directed by Tim Sutton and co-starring Jamie Bell and Frank Grillo. The film had its premiere at the 2018 Toronto International Film Festival.

In 2019, Qualley starred in the Netflix science-fiction film IO. The film was directed by Jonathan Helpert and it was released on January 18, 2019. She played Sam Walden, a teenager surviving as one of the last people on an abandoned post-cataclysmic Earth, who is racing to find a cure for her poisoned home world before the last shuttle off the planet to the distant human space colony leaves her stranded.

Also in 2019, Qualley portrayed the role of Mary Dalton in Rashid Johnson's HBO adaption of Native Son. In 2019, Qualley also portrayed actress and dancer Ann Reinking in the FX miniseries Fosse/Verdon, for which she received nominations for a Primetime Emmy Award for Outstanding Supporting Actress in a Limited Series or Movie and a Critics' Choice Television Award for Best Supporting Actress in a Movie/Miniseries. She then appeared in Quentin Tarantino's film Once Upon a Time in Hollywood, playing a member of the Manson Family named Pussycat. For the film, Qualley was nominated along with the rest of the cast for a Screen Actors Guild Award for Outstanding Performance by a Cast in a Motion Picture. She also starred in Seberg opposite Kristen Stewart and Jack O'Connell. directed by Benedict Andrews.

In 2020, Qualley starred in Wake Up, a short film directed by Olivia Wilde, and in the feature My Salinger Year, opposite Sigourney Weaver and directed by Philippe Falardeau, which had its world premiere at the Berlin International Film Festival in February 2020.

In 2021, Qualley starred in the miniseries Maid based upon Stephanie Land's memoir for Netflix.

Qualley will next star in the psychological thriller A Head Full of Ghosts directed by Scott Cooper; and in Stars at Noon opposite Joe Alwyn directed by Claire Denis.

In other media
In 2015, Qualley appeared in the short promotional film L'Américaine for American fashion label Tory Burch. In 2016, Qualley appeared as the central character in a Spike Jonze-directed commercial for KENZO World; choreographed by Ryan Heffington, Qualley improvised much of the dance routine using her training in classical ballet. Qualley and her sister Rainey appeared in the music video for Soko's 2017 single "Sweet Sound of Ignorance".

On May 29, 2019, it was revealed that Qualley would be playing "Mama" in Hideo Kojima's PlayStation 4 game Death Stranding. She also played the character of Lockne, Mama's twin sister, in the game.

Personal life
As of November 2019, Qualley lives in New York. Qualley formerly lived in Los Angeles with her sister Rainey, with whom she shares a dog named Books. Qualley describes her sister as "my idol, my best friend in the whole world". 

Qualley was briefly romantically linked to Pete Davidson in 2019.  She began dating actor Shia LaBeouf in 2020 after they co-starred in Rainey's music video "Love Me Like You Hate Me". Qualley and LaBeouf's relationship ended in January 2021 following controversies surrounding LaBeouf, including his ex-girlfriend and singer FKA twigs's lawsuit against him for sexual battery and assault. In September 2021, Qualley told Harper's Bazaar that she believed FKA twigs's allegations. Qualley is engaged to musician Jack Antonoff.

Filmography

Film

Television

Video games

Music videos

Short videos

Awards and nominations

References

External links
 

1994 births
21st-century American actresses
Actresses from North Carolina
Actresses from Montana
American film actresses
American female dancers
American dancers
American television actresses
Debutantes of le Bal des débutantes
Living people
Female models from Montana
Female models from North Carolina
New York University alumni
People from Asheville, North Carolina
Place of birth missing (living people)
IMG Models models